Gionatha Spinesi (born 9 March 1978) is an Italian former professional footballer who played as a forward.

Career
Born in Pisa, Spinesi started playing for Pisa Calcio. In November 1995 he signed for Inter Milan, however, he was not able to make appearance in the first team. Sold in January 1997 to Castel di Sangro, he played two unimpressive Serie B seasons for the small Serie B team. In June 1997 he joined A.S. Bari, where he made his Serie A debut and played six seasons. In February 2004, he was released for free by Bari following clashes with the board about his contract renewal.

In 2004–05, Spinesi played for newly promoted Serie B team Arezzo, where he scored 22 goals and won the league top scorer title. In 2005–06, Spinesi followed Siena coach Pasquale Marino in joining Catania, where he scored 23 goals and helped the team to promote to Serie A.

In 2006–07 Spinesi kept his excellent top flight record up by notching 17 goals and ensuring Catania remained in Serie A. During the 2007–08 season, however, Spinesi scored only seven goals in the league, but was still an influential part of the first team, as Catania again managed to avoid relegation. However, from 2008 onwards he failed to get back into the first team due to recurrent injuries, and he was released in June 2009. Spinesi successively announced his retirement from football, thus turning down an agreement he had previously found with Lega Pro Prima Divisione club Valle del Giovenco.

References 

1978 births
Living people
Sportspeople from the Province of Pisa
Italian footballers
Footballers from Tuscany
Association football forwards
Italy under-21 international footballers
Serie A players
Serie B players
Serie D players
Pisa S.C. players
Inter Milan players
A.S.D. Castel di Sangro Calcio players
S.S.C. Bari players
S.S. Arezzo players
Catania S.S.D. players